The retinoid X receptor (RXR) is a type of nuclear receptor that is activated by 9-cis retinoic acid, which is discussed controversially to be of endogenous relevance, and 9-cis-13,14-dihydroretinoic acid, which is likely to be the major endogenous mammalian RXR-selective agonist.

In a novel review publication, this 9-cis-13,14-dihydroretinoic acid was shown to be a metabolite not originating from the known vitamin A (vitamin A1) pathway and its nutritional precursors all-trans-retinol (vitamin A  (vitamin A1) or all-trans-beta-carotene (provitamin A (provitamin A1)).

An independent pathway for generating this endogenous RXR-ligand 9-cis-13,14-dihydroretinoic acid from 9-cis-13,14-dihydroretinol present in food source and named vitamin A5 or alternatively via provitamin A5 has been suggested as the first novel vitamin identified since 1948, cobalamin / vitamin B12.

RXR heterodimerizes with subfamily 1 nuclear receptors including CAR, FXR, LXR, PPAR, PXR, RAR, TR, and VDR.

As with other type II nuclear receptors, the RXR heterodimer in the absence of ligand is bound to hormone response elements complexed with corepressor protein.  Binding of agonist ligands to RXR results in dissociation of corepressor and recruitment of coactivator protein, which, in turn, promotes transcription of the downstream target gene into mRNA and eventually protein.

See also
 Retinoic acid receptor
 Retinoid X receptor alpha
 Retinoid X receptor beta
 Retinoid X receptor gamma

References

External links
 

Intracellular receptors
Transcription factors